Immanuel Libbok (born 15 July 1997) is a South African International rugby union player for the Springboks and  in United Rugby Championship as well as  in the Currie Cup. He is a utility back that can play as a fullback, fly-half, winger or centre.

Rugby career

2013–2015: Schoolboy rugby

Libbok was born in Humansdorp. He attended HTS Daniël Pienaar in Uitenhage, and earned his first provincial selection in 2013, representing Eastern Province at the Under-16 Grant Khomo Week, scoring tries in matches against the Blue Bulls and the Golden Lions.

Libbok moved to George for 2014, where he attended Hoërskool Outeniqua. He represented the George-based  at the premier South African high schools rugby union tournament, the Under-18 Craven Week, in both 2014 and 2015. In the first match at the 2015 tournament held in Stellenbosch, Libbok scored two tries, four conversions and one penalty for a personal points haul of 21 points in his side's 31–41 defeat to former side Eastern Province. He followed this up with a try and four conversions against the Golden Lions and a third try and two conversions against KwaZulu-Natal in their final match. He scored a total of 43 points in three matches, making him the top scorer at the competition, while his four tries were the joint-second most in the competition, one behind Western Province's Nico Leonard.

At the conclusion of the tournament, Libbok was included in a South Africa Schools team that played in the 2015 Under-18 International Series on home soil against their counterparts from Wales, France and England. He started on the left wing in their 42–11 victory over Wales in their first match, but dropped to the bench for match against France, not getting any game time in their 12–5 victory. He returned to the starting line-up for their final match against England, helping them to a 23–16 victory to finish the series with a 100% record.

2016–2017: Blue Bulls / South Africa Under-20

After high school, Libbok moved to Pretoria to join the  academy. In March 2016, he was included in a South Africa Under-20 training squad, and made the cut to be named in a reduced provisional squad a week later.

He also started their match against a  a week later, scoring his first senior points by slotting a penalty in the 15th minute of the match, and scoring his first try in the final ten minutes which proved decisive as the Blue Bulls won the match 20–17.

On 10 May 2016, Libbok was included in the final South Africa Under-20 squad for the 2016 World Rugby Under 20 Championship tournament to be held in Manchester in England. He started their opening match in Pool C of the tournament in the fly-half position, scoring a try as South Africa came from behind to beat Japan 59–19. He switched positions with fullback Curwin Bosch for their second pool match, a 13–19 defeat to Argentina, but reverted to fly-half as South Africa bounced back to secure a 40-31 bonus-point victory over France in their final pool match, with Libbok scoring his second try of the competition just after the hour mark. The result meant South Africa secured a semi-final place as the best runner-up in the competition, and Libbok started their semi-final match as they faced three-time champions England. The hosts proved too strong for South Africa, knocking them out of the competition with a 39–17 victory, and they also lost the third-place play-off match against Argentina, with the South American side beating South Africa for the second time in the tournament, convincingly winning 49–19 to condemn South Africa to fourth place in the competition. Libbok scored his third try of the competition in the defeat, to finish the competition with three tries, the joint-most by a South African player with Zain Davids and Edwill van der Merwe.

Libbok returned to domestic action for the  team in the 2016 Under-19 Provincial Championship. He made seven starts in the competition, scoring three tries during the season – one against  and two against  – as well as 35 points with the boot through 16 conversions and one penalty.

In November 2016, he was named in the  Super Rugby team's extended training squad during the team's preparations for the 2017 Super Rugby season.

2020–2021: Sharks

2021–: Stormers

National team
In October 2022, he was included in the squad for the Springboks' year-end tour.

References

South African rugby union players
Living people
1997 births
People from Humansdorp
Rugby union fly-halves
Rugby union centres
Rugby union wings
Rugby union fullbacks
Blue Bulls players
South Africa Under-20 international rugby union players
Bulls (rugby union) players
Sharks (rugby union) players
Sharks (Currie Cup) players
Stormers players
Rugby union players from the Eastern Cape
South Africa international rugby union players
Western Province (rugby union) players